Pennsylvania Railroad 7002 is a class "E7s" 4-4-2 "Atlantic" type steam locomotive built for the Pennsylvania Railroad by their own Altoona Works in August 1902. Today, it is on display at the Railroad Museum of Pennsylvania outside of Strasburg, Pennsylvania in the United States. Originally No. 8063, the PRR renumbered it to No. 7002 after the original, claimed to be a land-speed-record-setter, was scrapped. It is the only survivor of its class and was listed on the National Register of Historic Places in 1979.

History

Revenue service
The E7s-class was created by replacing the slide valves above the cylinders on the E2a, E2b and E2c-classes with piston valves. Unlike the E2, the E2a, b, c and subsequent E7s class used Belpaire firebox instead of a "radial stay" firebox. The original No. 7002 was an E2-class locomotive built in August 1902 by the Pennsylvania Railroad's Altoona Works in Altoona, Pennsylvania. On June 15, 1902, the Pennsylvania Railroad inaugurated its new 18-hour train service from New York City to Chicago, the Pennsylvania Special-forerunner to the famed Broadway Limited. 7002 was coupled to the train as the replacement locomotive in Crestline, Ohio. Delays east of Mansfield caused it to depart Crestline 25 minutes late. No. 7002 was claimed to have achieved 127.1 miles per hour (204.5 km/h) near Elida but this speed was based solely on two passing times recorded by separate observers at two different points (AY Tower and Elida) just 3 miles apart, and it is difficult to obtain even a general indication of a train's speed from signal box registers. (Speed on the East Coast Main Line p 69, by P Semmens). The train arrived on time in Fort Wayne, Indiana. It was scrapped in 1935. No. 8063 was an E2a-class also built in 1902 by the Altoona Works. It was upgraded to the E7s-class in 1916, No. 8063 was renumbered, altered to resemble No. 7002 and placed on exhibit as the "world's fastest steam engine" at the 1939 New York World's Fair and the Chicago Rairoad Fair in 1948–49. No. 7002 was transferred to the Railroad Museum of Pennsylvania from the Pennsylvania Railroad's historical collection in Northumberland, Pennsylvania in December 1979 by the Pennsylvania's successor Penn Central. No. 7002 was listed on the National Register of Historic Places on December 17, 1979. In 1982, No. 7002 was leased to Strasburg Railroad and operating there, mostly as a stand-in for their No. 89 which was undergoing a major rebuild for most of the 1980s.

Excursion service
On August 1, 1983, No. 7002 returned to service. While No. 7002 was restored to operate on the Strasburg Rail Road, it did have a few mainline outings, most of which were doubleheaders with stablemate 1223. On June 13, 1987, it hauled a special train to celebrate the 85th Anniversary of the Broadway Limited; PRR No. 1223 was present at the same event. On November 19, 1988, to celebrate the 125th anniversary of Abraham Lincoln's trip over the same route to make the Gettysburg Address. 

PRR No. 7002 made its last run on December 20, 1989, both No. 1223 and No. 7002 were removed from service when the Strasburg Railroad acquired an ultrasonic testing device in December 1989 and discovered that the metal sides of the locomotives' fireboxes were too thin to allow for safe operation.

Disposition
After retirement from SRC, 1223 and 7002 were moved across the street to the museum. No. 7002 currently sits pilot to pilot with No. 1223 at the entrance to the Railroad Museum of Pennsylvania's Rolling Stock Hall. On June 4, 2010, PRR 7002 & PRR 1223 were “fired up” for a photo event. Since then No. 7002 has sat on display in the museum alongside PRR No. 1223.

Gallery

Notes 

a. The record was never verified and was often disputed. The New York Times believed the claims to have been exaggerated with the speed being closer to, a still respectable, .

References

Sources

External links 

 Railroad Museum of Pennsylvania website

4-4-2 locomotives
Collection of the Railroad Museum of Pennsylvania
Individual locomotives of the United States
7002
Railway locomotives on the National Register of Historic Places in Pennsylvania
Standard gauge locomotives of the United States
Railway locomotives introduced in 1902
National Register of Historic Places in Lancaster County, Pennsylvania
Preserved steam locomotives of Pennsylvania